DYTX (95.1 FM) Bombo Radyo Tacloban is a radio station owned and operated by Bombo Radyo Philippines through its licensee Newsounds Broadcasting Network. Its studio and transmitter are located at Bombo Radyo Broadcast Center, 4th Floor Esperas Bldg. Real St., Tacloban.

History
Bombo Radyo was launched in 1989 under the callsign DYWR on 594 AM. On March 12, 2003, Bombo Radyo went off the air due to financial losses brought by a downtrend in the network's income for the past 5 years. These were the years when DZBB 594 or DXDB 594 were received via weak signal. 

On April 4, 2005, the station returned on air, this time on 95.1 FM, which was formerly known as The Gentle Wind from 1989 to 1994 and Star FM from 1994 to 2004.

References

Radio stations in Tacloban
Radio stations established in 1989